Bosso may refer to:
 Bosso, Nigeria, a Local Government Area in Niger State, Nigeria
 Bosso, Niger, a village and rural commune in Niger